Piar may refer to:

People
 Ilfred Piar, football player
 Manuel Piar (1774–1817)
 Zahir Uddin Piar, Bangladeshi film actor

Places
 Ciudad Piar, Venezuela
 Piar Municipality, Bolívar, Venezuela
 Piar Municipality, Monagas, Venezuela

Other
 Mission Piar